Sheikhgal or Watali is an unclassified Indo-Aryan language of Jammu and Kashmir, India. Its speakers, the formerly nomadic Watals, are found throughout Kashmir, particularly in the districts of Srinagar (Parimpora, Nowhatta, Dargah, Natipora, Hawal), Baramulla (Bandipora, Khawja Bagh, Sopore and Tangmarg), Pulwama (Lolaab and Lassipora) and Kupwara (Kanthpora, Kulgam, Haihama, Magam, Handwara, Tarathpora). Among its speakers the language is also known as Opedigal or Phiri kathi.

Although attitudes towards the language are generally negative, the community is compact and Sheikhgal is the dominant language within the home. However, in other domains (market, workplace etc.) the language of wider communication Kashmiri is the preferred choice, even with other speakers of Sheikhgal. Within the family, there is a slight shift away from using Sheikhgal (85% of those interviewed by Mullick speak Sheikhgal with their spouses but only 69% do so with their children).

References

Bibliography

Further reading 

Languages of Jammu and Kashmir
Unclassified Indo-Aryan languages